Farida Nekzad as a senior journalist and media trainer established the Center for the Protection of Afghan Women Journalists in Afghanistan ( CPAWJ) in 2017 and lead this organization till the return of the Taliban on 15 August 2021, after two weeks she left Afghanistan and start her work and education in Canada. She started her master's program in journalism and is still committed to working for journalists and supporting press freedom in Afghanistan.
Nekzad as a co-founder, managing editor and former deputy-director of Pajhwok Afghan News, Afghanistan's leading independent news agency, and former vice president of the South Asia Free Media Association for the South Asia Media Commission. 

She won the 2008 International Women's Media Foundation Courage in Journalism Award and an International Press Freedom Award from the Committee to Protect Journalists. The latter award is given for journalists who show courage in defending press freedom in the face of attacks, threats or imprisonment. In 2014, she has been awarded the "Prize for the Freedom and Future of the Media" of the Media Foundation of Sparkasse Leipzig public savings bank.

Personal life
She is married to Rahimullah Samander and has one daughter.

See also
Danish Karokhel, director of Pajhwok Afghan News

References

Living people
Afghan journalists
Year of birth missing (living people)
Place of birth missing (living people)
Afghan women journalists